Top, Azerbaijan may refer to:
 Top, Oghuz
 Top, Zangilan